Reginald James White (28 October 1935 – 27 May 2010), usually Reg White, was an English boat builder, sailor, Olympic champion and world champion. He won a gold medal in the Tornado class with John Osborn at the 1976 Summer Olympics in Montreal.

He became world champion in the tornado class in 1976 and 1979.

White died just after sailing his Brightlingsea One-Design

References

External links

1935 births
2010 deaths
English male sailors (sport)
Sailors at the 1976 Summer Olympics – Tornado
Olympic sailors of Great Britain
English Olympic medallists
Olympic gold medallists for Great Britain
Olympic medalists in sailing
20th-century English comedians
21st-century English comedians
Medalists at the 1976 Summer Olympics
People from Brightlingsea
Tornado class world champions
World champions in sailing for Great Britain